The term Education in Ireland may refer to either of two education systems in Ireland:

Education in the Republic of Ireland
Education in Northern Ireland